Coral Cove is a coastal locality in the Bundaberg Region, Queensland, Australia. It has been used as a diving point by tourists and contains the Coral Cove Golf course.

Geography

Barolin Rock is a rocky headland jutting into the Coral Sea on the locality's east coast.

The land use is predominantly residential interspersed with sections of the Coral Cove Golf Course. The Coral Cove Environment Reserve is in the north-east of the locality near the creek mouth. The western remnant of the locality is currently undeveloped.

The coastline of the locality is part of the Woongarra Coast section of the Great Sandy Marine Park. The Woongarra Coast has a rocky coastline which extends into the ocean with rocky outcrops that encourage the development of coral reefs. The coral reefs around Barolin Rock are some of the most significant examples of these southernmost coral reefs.

History 
In the 2011 census, Bundaberg had a population of 1,127 people.

During the 2013 Cyclone Oswald, parts of the town were damaged by excessive flooding and wind damage. No casualties were reported, civilian volunteers assisted with the clean up.

Education 
There are no schools in Coral Cove. The nearest primary school is Elliott Heads State School in neighbouring Elliott Heads to the south-west. The nearest secondary school is Kepnock State High School in Kepnock in Bundaberg to the west.

Attractions 
Being so close to the shore, Barolin Rock is a popular dive site, featuring both coral formations and a wide variety of turtles, rays, reef fish and other marine fauna.

Coral Cove Golf Course is an 18-hole championship golf courses. The course is available to members and the public. Regular competitions are held on five days each week. The associated resort provides accommodation, bars, restaurants, conference/function rooms and swimming pools.

References

External links

 Queensland information website

Localities in Queensland
Bundaberg Region
Coastline of Queensland